The Outwaters is a 2022 American horror film written, directed by, and starring Robbie Banfitch. It is presented as found footage from memory cards belonging to a group of friends who venture into the Mojave Desert to shoot a music video, where they encounter mysterious and threatening phenomena.

The Outwaters premiered at the New Jersey Film Festival on February 12, 2022, after which it screened at several other film festivals. The film was released in select theaters in the United States by Cinedigm on February 9, 2023.

Plot 
The film opens with a panicked 9-1-1 call along with visuals indicating that the four main cast members—Robbie, Angela, Scott, and Michelle—are missing. A title card explains that the subsequent footage was recovered from three memory cards found in the Mojave Desert.

Robbie is an aspiring filmmaker living in Los Angeles who has recruited his brother Scott and his friend Angela to help film a music video for his friend Michelle in the Mojave Desert. While getting ready for the expedition, he celebrates his brother's birthday, surprises his mother back home, parties with Angela, and talks to Michelle about her recently-deceased mother. Footage filmed from Robbie's apartment of two separate earthquakes is also shown.

The four friends pack their equipment and begin their journey, spending the first night at a small lake. They continue deeper into the desert the next day and encounter a pack of donkeys blocking the road. They arrive at their final location, a small hillside area near a dried-up lakebed, and begin setting up camp. At night, the four are awakened by booming sounds and frantic animal noises that appear to be getting closer. Scott and Robbie leave their tent to investigate but find no clues. Robbie continues by himself and sees a strobing light along a hillside path. 

The next day, the crew discuss the uncanny events of the previous evening and begin filming the video. During a break, Robbie and Michelle investigate the area where he saw the light and record high-pitched noises coming from a nearby hole, sensing something unusual beneath the earth. Robbie remarks that his camera battery has not gone down the entire time they’ve been there. Later, Robbie sees an axe at the top of a nearby hill. The crew head to the lakebed to finish filming the video, and the sound is overtaken by noises similar to the ones heard earlier in the hole. At night, the crew once again hear the booms and animal sounds. Robbie wanders off and sees a naked man on a hill wielding the axe. As he runs away, the man attacks Robbie off screen, giving him a head injury. Robbie returns to camp, bloody and disoriented, and finds Scott asleep but the women frantic.

The camera cuts to Robbie running through the desert as the two girls scream and plead for their lives. He encounters Scott and Angela, both soaked in blood. Robbie escapes and takes shelter in a small ravine until morning. He exits, naked and disoriented, and starts wandering the desert aimlessly. He finds that the area is now infested with screaming, fleshy, worm-like creatures. That night, he returns to the campsite to find the two tents covered in viscera and sees what appears to be Michelle's body. After a number of close calls with his assailant, Robbie is transported to a pool of red water by the light. He is taken back to the desert, vomits blood, and removes an unknown substance from his foot. He encounters the pack of donkeys, then sees a mirage of himself and his three friends in the past walking through the desert. He sees a blood-soaked Michelle running across the lakebed and chases her. He encounters a bloodied Scott and Angela, acting normally, at the campsite. Exiting the tent, he finds himself at his mother's house and then on the wing of a plane, where he sees Scott through the window.

Back in the desert, in total darkness, Robbie runs into a large monster, which closely inspects him and appears to be calling to similar creatures in the distance. He runs away and sees Angela back at camp, and the two are attacked by the worms. Robbie is again carried away by the red water, and the camera is shown rapidly flying through a series of white lights before returning to the desert. Robbie finds a gas mask and an old sign indicating that he is in a government-restricted area and encounters his assailant, who appears to be his doppelgänger. The next day, Robbie finds the decomposing heads of his three companions impaled on pikes. He then finds the tooth of a large animal on the ground. He uses it to sever his penis and then disembowels himself. The film ends with a shot of a fatally wounded Robbie reaching toward the sky.

Cast
 Robbie Banfitch as Robbie Zagorac
 Angela Basolis as Angela Bocuzzi
 Scott Schamell as Scott Zagorac
 Michelle May as Michelle August
 Leslie Ann Banfitch as Leslie Zagorac
 Aro Caitlin as Aro Aguilar
 Christine Brown as 911 Operator
 Nancy Bujnowski as Flight Attendant

Release
The Outwaters premiered at the New Jersey Film Festival on February 12, 2022. It went on to play on such other film festivals as the Unnamed Footage Festival, Panic Fest, and the Chattanooga Film Festival, as well as the Dead of Night Film Festival in Liverpool, England. By September 2022, the film's North American distribution rights were acquired by Cinedigm. By February 3, 2023, Blue Finch Film Releasing acquired the film's international distribution rights for territories outside North America.

The film is scheduled to receive a limited theatrical release by Cinedigm in the United States on February 9, 2023, followed by a release on the horror streaming service Screambox on February 17, 2023.

An after-party was held at a bar in Astoria, Queens on February 13, 2023 and included a showing of Harmony Korine’s Trash Humpers.

Reception

Critical response
On the review aggregator website Rotten Tomatoes, the film has a weighted average score of 72% based on 57 reviews, with an average rating of 8/10. Its critical consensus says, "The Outwaters may strike some viewers as frustratingly withholding, but it remains an ambitious -- and overall effective -- slice of found-footage horror."

Meagan Navarro of Bloody Disgusting commended the film for "[transforming] the found footage format into something far more transgressive", and wrote that, "Banfitch mercilessly lulls viewers with a soothing intro before ripping open a dark abyss beneath them, flinging them into an immersive pit of visceral madness." Grace Detwiler, writing for Rue Morgue, stated that the film "will likely be most effective for viewers who are strongly affected by the power of suggestion." Asserting that the film's handling of characterization is both its greatest fault and its greatest achievement, she added that "Banfitch has a clear talent for character development, which is thrown out the window as soon as the true horror begins. Yet, getting to know his cast of characters only makes watching their annihilation more gut-wrenching in the end."

Accolades

References

External links
 

2022 horror films
2023 horror films
2023 films
American horror films
Films set in deserts
Films set in the Southwestern United States
Found footage films
2020s English-language films